The  is a museum  in Gyōda, Saitama, Japan. The building is inside of Sakitama Kofun Park.  It is one of Japan's many museums which are supported by a prefecture.

In 2006, Saitama Prefecture renamed the museum as Museum of the Sakitama Ancient Burial Mounds and made its goals the research, collection, preservation of the site's archeological data as well as educating the site's cultural and historical value to its visitors.

Nearly 100,000 visitors come to the museum every year to learn about Sakitama Kofun Cluster and its artifacts, including a national treasure, Inariyama Sword. The museum consists of two buildings, Sakitama Shiseki Hall and Shōgunyama Kofun Exhibit Hall, which opened in 1997 and allows visitors to walk inside of the reconstructed stone chamber of the Shōgunyama Kofun.

See also
List of National Treasures of Japan (archaeological materials)

References

External links
https://web.archive.org/web/20080929032431/http://www.sakitama-muse.spec.ed.jp/top-page/home.html Museum official website
 Museum of the Sakitama Ancient Burial Mounds at Google Cultural Institute

Archaeology of death
Museums in Saitama Prefecture
Archaeological museums in Japan
Kofun